Bruceolide is a quassinoid that has been isolated from Bischofia javanica.  Synthetic derivatives have shown in vitro antimalarial activity.

References 

Quassinoids